Mary T. Mara (September 21, 1960 – June 26, 2022) was an American television and film actress known for her main role as Inspector Bryn Carson on Nash Bridges and appearances on primetime dramas ER and Law & Order.  She also appeared in Mr. Saturday Night.

Early life and education
Mara was born in Syracuse, New York, on September 21, 1960.  Her father, Roger, worked as the director of special events for the New York State Fair; her mother, Lucille, was an accountant.  Mara had a brother and two sisters.  She attended Corcoran High School in Syracuse.  After graduating, she studied at San Francisco State University and the Yale School of Drama, obtaining a Master of Fine Arts from the latter institution.

Career
Mara made her film debut in the 1989 television film The Preppie Murder.  In the same year, she participated in the New York Shakespeare Festival's production of Twelfth Night, alongside Michelle Pfeiffer, Jeff Goldblum and Mary Elizabeth Mastrantonio.  She later featured in Mr. Saturday Night (1992), starring alongside Billy Crystal as his character's estranged daughter.

Mara's breakthrough role came on ER, which was the most popular medical drama airing on prime time television during the mid-1990s.  She played Loretta Sweets, a patient with cervical cancer, in nine episodes from 1995 to 1996.  This helped spur her into the starring role of Inspector Bryn Carson on Nash Bridges from 1996 to 1997.  When reflecting on that role several years later, she noted that it was a "male-dominated show", adding that although the writers "started to write for me really well about halfway through the season", the producers "were afraid I would stand out too much."  She also featured on shows such as Law & Order, NYPD Blue, and Ally McBeal around this time.

During the later part of her career, Mara appeared as a recurring character in Dexter (2009) as Valerie Hodges and Ray Donovan (2013) as Mrs. Sullivan.  She also starred in the horror film Prom Night (2008).  Her final role was in the 2020 film Break Even.  After appearing in the film, Mara retired from acting.

Personal life
Mara lived a bicoastal life at New York City and Southern California. According to Jon Lindstrom, she underwent chemotherapy for cancer in 2008, when they performed together in the play In Heat by Malcolm Danare. Following her retirement from acting, she returned to Syracuse. She resided in Cape Vincent, New York, at the time of her death. Mara had a stepdaughter.

Mara died on the morning of June 26, 2022, in Cape Vincent. She was 61, and drowned while swimming in the St. Lawrence River. Tributes to Mara were posted on social media by Billy Crystal, Annette O'Toole, and Jon Lindstrom. Her death was ruled an accident.

Filmography

Film

Television

References

External links

1960 births
2022 deaths
20th-century American actresses
21st-century American actresses
Accidental deaths in New York (state)
Actresses from Syracuse, New York
American film actresses
American television actresses
Deaths by drowning in the United States
San Francisco State University alumni
Yale School of Drama alumni